Julian Charles Porteous (born 5 June 1949) is the Catholic Archbishop of Hobart, Tasmania. He was previously Auxiliary Bishop of Sydney, Australia, Episcopal Vicar for Renewal and Evangelisation, and Titular Bishop of Urusi (2003–2013).

Porteous was installed as Archbishop of Hobart on 17 September 2013.

In 2015 Porteous distributed a booklet to 12,000 families with children in Catholic schools across Tasmania entitled "Don’t Mess With Marriage" - the Catholic position on marriage. The booklet argued of gay men and women that "pretending that their relationships are ‘marriages’ is not fair or just to them." There were calls by activists for others to refer the Archbishop to the Australian Anti-Discrimination Commissioner.  Following 6 months of deliberations, the complaint was withdrawn without a finding.

It has been reported that, "The real problem with the Porteous case was that it was unresolved".

See also
 Roman Catholic Archdiocese of Hobart#Controversy

References

External links

1949 births
Living people
Roman Catholic archbishops of Hobart